Shealy is a family name and may refer to:

Al Shealy (1900 - 1967), Major League Baseball pitcher
Alan Shealy (born 1953), an American rower
Courtney Shealy, former freestyle swimmer from the United States
Dal Shealy, 29th head college football coach for the University of Richmond Spiders
Katrina Shealy (born 1954), an American politician
Rod Shealy, Republican political consultant and publisher from South Carolina
Ryan Shealy, Major League Baseball first baseman for the Tampa Bay Rays
Shack Shealy, former head coach of the Clemson college football program
Steadman S. Shealy, American attorney and former college quarterback
Vic Shealy, American football assistant coach for the Kansas Jayhawks